Jonathan Goldman is an American author, musician and spiritual teacher in the fields of Harmonics and Sound Healing. He is based in Boulder, Colorado.

Career
Goldman began as a guitarist in the Boston punk scene in the late 1970s. Goldman began to research the science of sound and music psychology, directing his overall studies towards the possible use of sound as a healing force. 

In 1982, he founded the Sound Healers Association (SHA) in Lexington, Massachusetts.

During this time, Goldman continued his research with a master's degree from Lesley University.

He began recording his own music and he formed Spirit Music, one of the first record labels dedicated to the therapeutic use of sound and music. The label has recorded and released music by Goldman, as well as Don Campbell, Sarah Benson, Sam McClellan, Laraaji, the Gyume Monks and more recently, Lama Tashi, among others.

In 2011 Jonathan Goldman was inducted into the Massage Therapy Hall of Fame. That year, he was also included by the Watkins Review as 74 on its list of "100 Most Spiritually Influential Living People in the World".

Connection to Tibetan Buddhism
During his research, Goldman worked with the Gyume Monks. Goldman met and became a student of the monks during their 1988 US Tour.

He later went on to meet the Tibetan Buddhist Monk, Rinchen Chugyal, then Chant Master for the Drepung Loseling Monastery. In 1995 Rinchen Chugyal ordained Goldman as a Chant Master, empowering him to teach Tibetan Chanting in the West. He also met the Venerable Ngawang Tashi Bapu (Lama Tashi), who succeeded Rinchen Chugyal as Chant Master. Lama Tashi recorded several sessions of Tibetan chanting with Goldman. His 'Tibetan Master Chants', recorded and produced by Goldman, was nominated for a Grammy Award in 2004.

Goldman's chanting has been featured on several recordings, notably the 1999 Grammy Award-winning album by Kitaro, 'Thinking of You'; his own 'Chakra Chants' series; 'Chakra Dance', which was produced for the opening of a holistic dance club in New York City, and 'Medicine Buddha', made for the US teachings of the Dalai Lama in 2001.

Discography and bibliography
As of June 2018, there are over 30 albums of Jonathan Goldman's own music released on Spirit Music and other labels. His music has ranged from new-age, chanting, ambient, minimalist, to techno.

As of June 2018 Goldman has written eight books in the field of sound healing which have been published. Four of Goldman's books have been published in numerous languages and are Best Sellers.

Discography

Bibliography

Personal life
Goldman grew up in New Jersey, at a family-owned kosher hotel. His father, Irving B. Goldman was an otolaryngologist and plastic surgeon. Jonathan's wife, Andi Goldman, is a licensed therapist.

References

External links
 Sound Healers Association
 Jonathan Goldman's Healing Sounds
 World Sound Healing Day
 [ Discography at www.allmusic.com]

Ambient musicians
American male non-fiction writers
Living people
New Age writers
New-age musicians
Tibetan Buddhists
Year of birth missing (living people)
Musicians from Boulder, Colorado
Place of birth missing (living people)
American writers about music
Writers from Boulder, Colorado